Amazonka is the sixth studio album by Ruslana. The album was released in Eastern Europe, Germany, China and other countries.

The album is based on the book Wild Energy. Lana. In the book, Lana breaks free from the normal cycle of an energy-efficient-gone-wrong future life. Each track is in order to the chapters of the book, conveying the different emotions in what the character and co-characters feel. Ruslana's music has turned to a new electronic/futuristic feel, in keeping with the setting of the book.

About the album

The people who created this album tend to characterize its original style as pop-fantasy. It's based on hurricane music chapters – the ones which conjure up pictures of fights between Tolkien's orcs and confrontation of Elements of Nature in Carpathians. Lightning, thunderstorm, hurricanes and industrial sounds of terrific fantastic plant – they are regular instruments in songs of "Amazon". But despite the above, the dense commercial sound and modern jagged grooves attribute to the album. These features are common in American charts’ top hits. This is particularly due to the fantastic work completed by American producers Trevor Flercher (director of Hit Factory Criteria studio in Miami) and Egoworks Music. A portion of exotics is in ethnical (rather Balkan) motives and samples. Several authentic instruments sound as though they're not as real but owned to tribes from mystical tales. And the central kernel of this all is, of course, Ruslana's distinctive drive and energy.

On the Czech and Slovak editions of the album, a bonus track is included.

Track listing

Release history

Chart performance

Singles 
 Dyka Enerhija 
 Vidlunnya mrii 
 Vohon' chy lid 
 Dykj anhel 
 Ya jdu za toboju

External links
 http://ruslana.com.ua/releases/new2008/02_04_eng.html

References 

Ruslana albums
2008 albums